Balonmano Sinfín is a team of handball based in Santander, Spain. It plays in Liga ASOBAL.

History

The club was founded on April 14, 2004. The men's team started in the Spanish third division. In 2008, they moved up to the second division, and in 2015 to the first division: Liga ASOBAL. The club was relegated from the first division in 2017, but managed to return after just one season. Since 2018, the club has been continuously playing in the first division. In the ASOBAL Cup in 2021, the team reached the final, which they lost against Barcelona.

Crest, colours, supporters

Kits

Team

Current squad 

Squad for the 2022–23 season

Technical staff
 Head coach:  Rubén Garabaya
 Assistant coach:  Luis Miguel Garabaya
 Fitness coach:  Javier Palazuelos
 Physiotherapist:  Javier Martín Izquierdo
 Club Doctor:  Juan José Díaz-Munío Carabaza

Transfers

Transfers for the 2022–23 season

Joining 
  Mohamed Aly (GK) from  Angers SCO Handball
  Nicolás Bono (CB) from  CB Zamora
  Marcos Aguilella (RW) from  CB Ikasa Madrid

Leaving 
  Jaka Malus (CB) to  Frisch Auf Göppingen
  Ramiro Martínez (RW) to  BM Benidorm
  Diógenes Cruz (CB) to  BM Huesca
  Francisco Javier Castro (CB) to  Helvetia Anaitasuna
  David Roca Rodríguez (RB) to  BM Granollers
  Pau Guitart (GK) to  CB Los Dólmenes Antequera
  Carlos Lastra (LW) to  CB Pereda
  Alejandro Blázquez (RW) (retires)
  Carlos Molina Cosano (LB)

Previous Squads

Season by season

EHF ranking

Former club members

Notable former players

  Francisco Javier Castro (2019–2022)
  Pablo Paredes (2015–2017)
  Nicolás Bono (2022–)
  Ramiro Martínez (2020–2022)
  Élcio Fernandes (2019–2021)
  Mohamed Aly (2022–)
  Darko Dimitrievski (2018-2021)
  Mile Mijušković (2019-2020)
  Gonçalo Ribeiro (2020)
  Darius Makaria (2016–2017)
  Jaka Malus (2022)
  Vladyslav Ostroushko (2021)

Former coaches

References

External links
 
 

Sport in Santander, Spain
Spanish handball clubs
Liga ASOBAL teams
Sports teams in Cantabria
Handball in Cantabria